Pulsatilla pratensis (syn. Anemone pratensis), the small pasque flower, is a species of flowering plant in the family Ranunculaceae, native to central and eastern Europe, from southeast Norway and western Denmark south and east to Bulgaria.

Name
The Latin specific epithet pratensis means "from the meadow", referring to one of its typical habitats.

Description
The leaves are finely divided and thread-like, and densely covered with silvery hairs. The flowers are hermaphrodite, and are pollinated by bees; flowering is from early to mid spring.

Subspecies
There are a number of subspecies:
Pulsatilla pratensis subsp. pratensis
Pulsatilla pratensis subsp. bohemica 
Pulsatilla pratensis subsp. hungarica 
Pulsatilla pratensis subsp. nigricans 
Pulsatilla pratensis subsp. ucrainica 
Pulsatilla pratensis nothosubsp. zichyi 

Pulsatilla pratensis subsp. hungarica grows in E Slovakia, NE Hungary and NW Romania. In Slovakia and Romania it is categorized as critically endangered CR. In Hungary it is protected by law. It occurs on open sand-plains and avoids limestone. In Hungary it can be found in two regions, the Nyírség and Bodrogköz.

Cultivation and uses
This plant is toxic, but can be dissipated through heat or drying.

References

pratensis
Plants described in 1753
Taxa named by Carl Linnaeus
Taxa named by Philip Miller